Maharaja Gemunu (King Gemunu) is a 2015 Sri Lankan Sinhala epic film directed by Jayantha Chandrasiri and produced by Gunapala Rathnasekara for Sipvin Films. It stars Uddika Premarathna and Jackson Anthony in lead roles along with Sriyantha Mendis and Yashoda Wimaladharma. Its music was composed by Nadeeka Guruge. It is the 1221st Sri Lankan film in the Sinhala cinema.

The movie is based on the odyssey of King Gemunu (ruler of Sri Lanka 161–137 BC) who is renowned for defeating and overthrowing King Elara, the usurping Tamil prince from the Chola Kingdom, who had invaded the Kingdom of Rajarata in 205 BC.

Synopsis

King Elara is a former soldier and spy under King Kharawela of Kalinga, who rules the Southern Kingdoms of India during the second century BC. Elara arrives at Lankadveepa, in the guise of an overseas naval chief, in order to threaten the prosperity of the Kingdom. Elara is victorious against the Kingdom of Rajarata, having killed King Asela. However, he is not satisfied with his victory because the kingdom of Ruhuna continues to be independent and he is haunted by a prophecy inscribed by King Devanampiyatissa.

Bhattara, an advisor to Elara, found the inscribed prophecy which alluded to a King named Gamani Abhaya (Dutu Gemunu) who would later secure the Kingdom of Rajarata and build a massive pagoda (dageba) at its center. Bhattara and Elara scheme against the prophecy.

King Gamani Abhaya deploys strategies to overcome the tactics of Elara and vanquish him. However, because of his spiritual ideology, he does not allow his people to forget the humanity that was rooted within the enemy. This act universalizes King Gamani's profound humanity.

Cast
 Uddika Premarathna as King Dutugemunu
 Jackson Anthony as King Ellalan
 Sriyantha Mendis as King Kavan Tissa
 Kusum Renu as Queen Viharamahadevi
 Tharuka Wanniarachchi as Young Queen Viharamahadevi
 Saranga Disasekara as Saddha Tissa
 Yashoda Wimaladharma as Queen Dharatri (Elara's wife) 
 Buddhadasa Vithanarachchi as Monk Mahasiva
 Sandun Bandara as Bhattara
 Ajith Weerasinghe as Nandimithra
 Arjuna Kamalanath as Suranimala
 Anura Dharamasiriwardana as Welusumana
 Umali Thilakarathne as Elara's daughter
 Damitha Abeyratne as Rohini
 Buddhini Purnima as Kathee
 Lucky Dias as Minister Mahananda
 Rebeka Nirmali as Dancer
 Meena Kumari as Dancer
 Randiv Ranga Jayawardena as Deeghabaya
 Uditha Nishantha as Nandi
 Muditha Wijesundera as Tissa Senevi
 Hemantha Randunu as Panimuththa Senevi
 Maithree Peramuna as Ghotagaththa Tissa 
 Anuruddha Chamila as Gotaimbara
 Lahiru Prasanna as Pussadeva
 Don Vipularatne as Kanchadeva
 Mahesh Premathilake as Therapuththabhya
 Asitha Nuwan as Bharana
 Ajith Silva as Labiya Wasabha
 Jagath Jayawardene as Maha Sona

Music
The music for Maharaja Gemunu was composed by Nadeeka Guruge, with lyrics written by Jayantha Chandrasiri and Rev. Pallegama Hemarathana Thero.

Release and reception
The film premiered on 23 January 2015 in EAP Holdings  cinema halls. Released on 23 January 2015, the film was highly acclaimed by critics and fans alike, who considered it to be a landmark in Sinhala film-making and an achievement in the epic film genre. The film earned 1000 Lakhs of Sri Lankan rupees until December 2017.

Awards and nominations
Sarasaviya Film Awards 2016
 Best Movie
 Most Popular Movie of the Year
 Best Actor in a Leading Role (Male) – Jackson Anthony as King Elara
 Best Cinematography – Ruwan Kostha
 Best Editing – Raveendra Guruge
 Best Music Direction – Nadeeka Guruge
 Best Art Direction – Rohan Samaradiwakara and Aruna Priyantha Dharmapala
 Best Playback Singer (Female) – Nirosha Virajini for the song "Sanda Mandala Vee"
 Best Makeup – Jayantha Ranawaka
 Best Sound Design – Priyantha Kaluarachchi
 Best Lyricist – Ven. Pallegama Hemarathana for the song "Sanda Mandala Vee"

Hiru Golden Film Awards 2016
 Most Popular Movie 
 Best Actor in a Supporting Role (Female) – Kusum Renu as Queen Viharamahadevi
 Best Playback Singer (Female) – Nirosha Virajini for the song "Sanda Mandala Vee"
 Best Lyricist – Ven. Pallegama Hemarathana for the song "Sanda Mandala Vee"
 Special Jury Award – Jackson Anthony as King Elara

See also
 List of Asian historical drama films

References

External links
 

2015 films
2010s historical films
Films set in the Anuradhapura period
Sri Lankan historical films
2010s Sinhala-language films